The term bozo bit has been used in two contexts. Initially a weak copy protection system in the 1980s Apple classic Mac OS, the term "flipping the bozo bit" was later reused to describe a decision to ignore a person's input.  It is a whimsical term, possibly derived from the classic children's comedy character, Bozo the Clown.

Weak copy protection
In early versions of Apple's classic Mac OS, the "bozo bit" (also called the "no copy" flag in some documentation) was one of the flags in the Finder Information Record, which described various file attributes. When the bit was set, the file could not be copied. It was called the bozo bit because it was copy protection so weak that only a bozo would think of it, and only a bozo would be deterred by it. 

The cassette and ROM filing systems and the Advanced Disc Filing System of Acorn MOS feature a rudimentary copy protection mechanism where a file with a certain flag set cannot be loaded except to execute it.

The Compact Disc has a similar "no copy" bit in the subcode, but nearly all disc-copying software ignores it, and usually removes it on copies. Consumer-grade dedicated hardware audio disc copiers usually honor the bozo bit, and will refuse to copy a disc with the bit set. Professional disc copiers ignore the bozo bit and will copy a protected disc.

Dismissing a person as not worth listening to
In his 1995 book Dynamics of Software Development, which presented a series of rules about the political and interpersonal forces that drive software development, Jim McCarthy applied the bozo bit notion to the realm of human interaction.

In his book, McCarthy's rule #4 is "Don't Flip The Bozo Bit". His reasoning is that everyone has something to contribute it's easy and tempting, when someone ticks a person off or is mistaken (or both), to simply disregard all their input in the future by setting the "bozo flag" to TRUE for that person. But by taking that lazy way out, the person poisons team interactions and cannot avail themselves of help from the "bozo" ever again.

See also
 Bozo the Clown
 Evil bit

References

External links
 Setting the Bozo Bit as an Antipattern

Apple Inc. software
Classic Mac OS
Proprietary software
Computing culture
Copy protection
Technology neologisms